Weightless is the second studio album by the American singer-songwriter Katie Herzig, which was released in 2006.

Track listing

References

2006 albums
Katie Herzig albums